Willison is a surname. Notable people with the surname include:

Brian Willison (born 1977), American academic; former Executive Director of the Parsons Institute for Information Mapping
David Willison (1919–2009), British soldier
David Willison (pianist) (born 1936), English pianist
George F. Willison (1896–1972), writer and editor who specialized in American history
Herbert Willison (1872–1943), English solicitor and Liberal Party, later Liberal National politician
Jackson Willison (born 1988 ), New Zealand rugby union footballer
John Willison (1680–1750), Scottish clergyman
John Stephen Willison (1856–1927), Canadian newspaperman, author, and businessman
Kevin Willison (born 1958), Canadian professional ice hockey player
Leigh Willison (born 1969), Australian rules football player
Marjorie Willison, Canadian author of books on gardening and a radio personality
Simon Willison, co-creator of the Django web framework
Walter Willison (born 1947), American stage actor

See also 
Willison coupler, a railway coupling.
Willison railway station in Melbourne, Australia
John Willison (disambiguation)
Williston (disambiguation)